Merrelyn Emery (27 April 1940) is an Australian social scientist and adjunct professor at Department of Applied Human Sciences, Concordia University, and has a first class honours degree from University of New England (Australia) and a PhD from University of New South Wales. She is best known for her work with Fred Emery on the theoretical framework called Open Systems Theory (OST), including refinement of the related Search Conference participative planning process and Participative Design Workshop methodology, both which are part of the dialogic organization development toolset.

Since 1970, she has worked to develop both the theory and methods of open systems using action research with organizations and communities. She was a faculty member at Australian National University and has served on several diverse community and educational organizations around the world.

She regards humans as "innately social animals; we grow only according to the density of interconnections we share with a group," and that "the basic unit of society is the group, not the individual". These groups, be it families, communities, and organizations, is in OST seen as an open social system that transacts with its environment, the external social field, and co-evolution and active adaptation is needed for sustainability and harmony. Socioecology captures the notion of people-in-environments. Included within this is the concept of open, jointly optimized, sociotechnical systems, optimizing human purposefulness and creativity, and the best options afforded by changing technologies. This can be achieved by employing the two-stage model, the Search Conference and the Participative Design Workshop, whose purpose is to create change toward a world that is consciously designed by people, and for people, living harmoniously within their ecological systems, both physical and social. "As the purpose of the two-stage model is to build a community, most work takes place in plenary, generating excitement, joy, and the energy that powers diffusion."

Publications
Merrelyn Emery is the author or coauthor of ten books, eight edited books, 35 book chapters, 60 journal articles, and contributed 29 institutional research
reports including several national studies (e.g. Project Australia, the National Telecom Study, Workplace Australia and Future Directions).

Papers and articles, a selection:
 1986. Towards an heuristic theory of diffusion. Hum. Relat. 39(5), 411–432. doi.org/10.1177%2F001872678603900503.
 2000. The Current Version of Emery's Open Systems Theory. Systemic Practice and Action Research, 2000 - Springer. doi.org/10.1023/A:1009577509972.
 2010. Refutation of Kira & van Eijnatten's critique of the Emery's open systems theory. Systems Research and Behavioral Science, 2010. Wiley Online Library. doi.org/10.1002/sres.1010.
 2014. Better late than never: Open systems theory's plan to deal with climate change. In Metcalf Gary S, Social Systems and Design. Translational Systems Sciences, pp185–211. Springer. doi.org/10.1007/978-4-431-54478-4_8.

Books, a selection:
 1982. Searching: for New Directions, in New Ways, for New Times. Canberra, Centre for Continuing Education, Australian National University. Updated edition of part I at www.socialsciencethatactuallyworks.com.
 1993. Participative Design for Participative Democracy. Revised and enlarged 1989 edition. CCE, ANU. Introduction and more at www.socialsciencethatactuallyworks.com.
 1997. The Search Conference in The Social Engagement of Social Science, a Tavistock Anthology, Volume 3. Philadelphia: University of Pennsylvania Press.
 1999. Searching: The theory and practice of making cultural change. John Benjamins Publishing.
 2004. Open systems theory in Dynamics of Organizational Change and Learning. John Wiley & Sons.
 2021. Did 9/11 change the world? Tracking the future. Amazon.

References

External links 
 www.socialsciencethatactuallyworks.com, website with work of Fred and Merrelyn Emery and colleagues on the Open Systems Theory (OST).
 Papers in the National Library of Australia.
 Books listed on Goodreads.
 

Year of birth missing (living people)
Living people
Cybernetics
Systems psychologists
Systems scientists
Australian scientists